Wetton is a civil parish in the district of Staffordshire Moorlands, Staffordshire, England. It contains 19 listed buildings that are recorded in the National Heritage List for England. Of these, one is at Grade II*, the middle of the three grades, and the others are at Grade II, the lowest grade. The parish contains the village of Wetton and the surrounding countryside. Most of the listed buildings are in the village and include a church, houses, farmhouses and cottages. Around the site of Wetton Mill is a group of listed buildings, including a bridge, and to the northeast of these are two relatively isolated listed buildings, a house and a farmhouse. Further along the river is another bridge.


Key

Buildings

References

Citations

Sources

Lists of listed buildings in Staffordshire